United Nations Security Council resolution 672, adopted unanimously on 12 October 1990, after reaffirming resolutions 476 (1980), 478 (1980), the Council expressed alarm at the 1990 Temple Mount riots in Jerusalem on 8 October 1990, resulting in the death of over 20 Palestinians and the injury of more than 150 people, including Palestinian civilians and worshippers.

The Council went on to condemn the actions of the Israeli security forces, calling on Israel to abide by its legal obligations under the Fourth Geneva Convention. Resolution 672 also authorised a mission to be sent to the region to investigate the incident, reporting back by the end of October 1990.

Israel rejected the resolution, saying it did not pay attention to attacks on Jewish worshippers at the Western Wall.

See also
 Arab–Israeli conflict
 First Intifada
 Israeli–Palestinian conflict
 List of United Nations Security Council Resolutions 601 to 700 (1987–1991)
 United Nations Security Council Resolution 673
 1990 Temple Mount riots

External links
 
Text of the Resolution at undocs.org

References

 0672
 0672
Israeli–Palestinian conflict and the United Nations
October 1990 events